Clive is a small town, ten kilometres from the city centres of both Napier and Hastings in the Hawke's Bay region of New Zealand's North Island. It is close to the mouth of the Ngaruroro River.

The town is part of the Hastings district. It was named (like many of the towns in the vicinity) after a prominent person from imperial India, in this case Robert Clive, better known as "Clive of India". The name was given by John Curling.

The town of Clive is mainly rural, yet with the increasing number of people moving into Hawke's Bay, and Clive being at the meeting point of Hastings and Napier, new subdivisions are being built to accommodate the growing population.

Clive is home to the Hawke's Bay Rowing Club who train on the Clive River. The Hawke's Bay Rowing Regatta is held on the first weekend of the year and was started in 1872.

Demographics

Clive had a population of 2,247 at the 2018 New Zealand census, an increase of 165 people (7.9%) since the 2013 census, and an increase of 372 people (19.8%) since the 2006 census. There were 771 households, comprising 1,116 males and 1,131 females, giving a sex ratio of 0.99 males per female. The median age was 44.5 years (compared with 37.4 years nationally), with 438 people (19.5%) aged under 15 years, 333 (14.8%) aged 15 to 29, 1,068 (47.5%) aged 30 to 64, and 414 (18.4%) aged 65 or older.

Ethnicities were 86.2% European/Pākehā, 19.5% Māori, 3.1% Pacific peoples, 3.6% Asian, and 0.8% other ethnicities. People may identify with more than one ethnicity.

The percentage of people born overseas was 13.8, compared with 27.1% nationally.

Although some people chose not to answer the census's question about religious affiliation, 52.7% had no religion, 33.9% were Christian, 2.0% had Māori religious beliefs, 0.5% were Hindu, 0.5% were Buddhist and 2.5% had other religions.

Of those at least 15 years old, 306 (16.9%) people had a bachelor's or higher degree, and 402 (22.2%) people had no formal qualifications. The median income was $30,400, compared with $31,800 nationally. 258 people (14.3%) earned over $70,000 compared to 17.2% nationally. The employment status of those at least 15 was that 915 (50.6%) people were employed full-time, 279 (15.4%) were part-time, and 33 (1.8%) were unemployed.

Marae

The town has two marae.

Kohupātiki Marae and Tanenuiarangi meeting house are a meeting place of the Ngāti Kahungunu hapū of Ngati Hōri and Ngāti Toaharapaki.

Matahiwi Marae and Te Matau a Māui meeting house are a meeting place of the Ngāti Kahungunu hapū of Ngāti Hāwea and Ngāti Kautere.

In October 2020, the Government committed $6,020,910 from the Provincial Growth Fund to upgrade a group of 18 marae, including both Kohupātiki and Matahiwi. The funding was expected to create 39 jobs.

Education

References

Hastings District
Populated places in the Hawke's Bay Region
Populated places around Hawke Bay